The Independence Congregational Church on  Fort Berthold Indian Reservation, near Mandaree in Dunn County, North Dakota, was listed on the National Register of Historic Places in 2015.

The church's bell was donated by the Broadway Tabernacle in New York City.

The church was a mission of the Congregational Church, with missionary Charles Hall and his wife arriving on May 9, 1876 to build a Congregational Mission.

References

External links
Photo of church
Photo of social hall plus church
Harold Case Photograph Collection 00041 finding aid

National Register of Historic Places in Dunn County, North Dakota

Congregational churches in North Dakota
Native American history of North Dakota
Mandan, Hidatsa, and Arikara Nation
Churches on the National Register of Historic Places in North Dakota
1876 establishments in Dakota Territory
Churches completed in 1876
Native American Christianity